Listriodontinae was an extinct subfamily of even-toed ungulates that existed during the Miocene in Europe, Africa, and Asia.

References

Prehistoric Suidae
Mammal subfamilies
Miocene mammals of Asia
Miocene even-toed ungulates